Mohammad Ibrahim Mohammad Al-Sahlawi (born 10 January 1987) is a Saudi Arabian professional footballer who plays as a striker. Al-Sahlawi won the best player of the league twice in a row in 2013–14 and 2014–15.

Club career

Al-Qadisiya
Al-Sahlawi was 17 years old when his talent started to become clear, during his participation in the "Karkiz" Championship which led to Adel Body (the administrative of Al-Qadisiya Handball) registering him in Al-Qadisiya, so he signed for SR40,000 and a car. After only two seasons, specifically in the 2006–07 season (when Yasser Al-Qahtani moved to Al-Hilal with the largest deal ever at that time), Sahlawi broke into the first team squad so he had to assume responsibility of the Al-Qadisiya attack alongside his teammate Yousef Al-Salem. Following administration issues, Al-Sahlawi experienced a difficult period where he was relegated to the bench, while at the same time he was leading the Saudi Olympic team.

Following Al-Qadisiya's relegation to the first division and the departure of most of the star players in the team. Al-Sahlawi was lent to Al-Fateh and played five matches scoring one goal. Despite other offers, he returned to Al-Qadisiya. In his return season, he scored 18 goals and registered 8 assists. At the end of the season, he signed a new deal with Al-Qadisiya for three years for a contract worth SR3 million. He ended the 2008 season as the Top Goalscorer in Saudi First Division.

Al-Nassr
He moved to Al-Nassr in 2009 for SR32 million ($8 million), breaking Yasser Al-Qahtani record transfer as the largest deal in Saudi football history.

In his first season with Al-Nassr, Al-Sahlawi scored 21 goals in 36 matches and received the Young Player of the Year award from STC.

In 2015, he was selected as one of the world's best top goalscorers by the IFFHS.

On 29 March 2018, it was confirmed that he will spend three weeks training with Manchester United in order to sharpen up his game ahead of the 2018 FIFA World Cup in Russia.

Al-Shabab
On 2 August 2019, Al-Shabab announced signing with Al-Sahlawi on a free transfer.

Muaither
On 2 August 2021, Al-Sahlawi announced that he would be joining Qatari side Muaither on his Twitter account.

Al-Hazem
On 14 December 2021, Al-Hazem announced signing with Al-Sahlawi on a free transfer.

International career

Youth
Al-Sahlawi scored his first goal for the national team in the 2006 AFC Youth Championship against Iraq U-20 in the 52nd minute. The game ended in a draw with a score of 2–2. His second came against Malaysia U-20 within 13 minutes, and they won with a score of 2–0, although they lost in the quarter-finals against Japan U-20 1 goal to 2.

Senior
On 3 September 2015, Al-Sahlawi scored his first senior hat-trick, in a 7–0 defeat of Timor-Leste in a 2018 FIFA World Cup qualifier. He scored another 5 goals on 17 November 2015 in a 10–0 drubbing of Timor-Leste.

In May 2018, he was named in Saudi Arabia’s preliminary squad for the 2018 FIFA World Cup in Russia. He was named in the final squad on 4 June.

Career statistics

Club

International
Statistics accurate as of match played 20 June 2018.

International goals

Score and Result list Saudi Arabia's goal tally first

Honours

Club
Al-Qadisiyah
Saudi First Division: 2008–09

Al-Nassr
Saudi Professional League: 2013–14, 2014–15, 2018–19
Saudi Crown Prince Cup: 2013–14

References

External links

SLStat.com Profile

1987 births
Living people
Saudi Arabia international footballers
Saudi Arabian footballers
Al Nassr FC players
Al-Qadsiah FC players
Al-Fateh SC players
Al-Shabab FC (Riyadh) players
Al-Taawoun FC players
Muaither SC players
Al-Hazem F.C. players
People from Eastern Province, Saudi Arabia
2015 AFC Asian Cup players
Association football forwards
Saudi Professional League players
Saudi First Division League players
Qatari Second Division players
2018 FIFA World Cup players
Expatriate footballers in Qatar
Saudi Arabian expatriate sportspeople in Qatar